Lai Lung is a lake near Riom-Parsonz in the Grisons, Switzerland.

Lakes of Switzerland
Lakes of Graubünden
LLaiLung
Surses